Babyteeth is a 2019 Australian coming-of-age comedy-drama film directed by Shannon Murphy from a screenplay by Rita Kalnejais, based upon her stage play of the same name. It stars Eliza Scanlen (in her first film appearance), Toby Wallace, Emily Barclay, Eugene Gilfedder, Essie Davis, and Ben Mendelsohn. The film had its world premiere at the Venice Film Festival on 4 September 2019. It was released in Australia on 23 July 2020 by Universal Pictures and won nine AACTA awards, including Best Film.

Scanlen plays Milla, a 16-year-old girl from a wealthy family who falls in love with a drug-addict named Moses shortly before she has a cancer recurrence.

Plot
Milla Finlay is a 16-year-old school girl, recently diagnosed with cancer. On her way home from school one day she meets 23-year-old Moses on a railway platform, and he almost immediately asks her for money. Milla quickly develops a crush on Moses and introduces him to her parents: Anna, a musician, and Henry, a psychiatrist. Both are uncomfortable with Moses due to the age difference between him and Milla, but are permissive due to Milla's illness.

A while later, Anna wakes up at night and discovers Moses in the process of robbing the family for prescription drugs. Milla and Henry wake up and are alerted to the situation, but while Henry wants to call the police Milla pleads for leniency, which Anna allows, noticing how much happier Milla is with Moses. The following day Anna warns Moses to stay away from her daughter.

Moses continues to visit Milla at school. After she tracks him down one night Moses takes her on his drug runs and then to a party. They later spend the night together on a rooftop, where Moses abandons Milla. Her distraught parents eventually track the weakened Milla down and take her to the hospital.

Aware that they are unable to stop the relationship between Milla and Moses, Henry and Anna become more permissive of their relationship allowing Moses to frequently visit her. When Milla gets ill at home, Anna realises that Moses had stolen her medication. Milla becomes angry, believing that Moses is using her for her father's access to drugs, and kicks him out of her home.

Later Henry tracks Moses down and asks him to come live with the family, promising him access to drugs as long as he continues to make Milla happy. For a while, the family and Moses live in a kind of harmony, until Milla discovers her father is drugging Moses. She gets angry and asks Moses to leave. He eventually comes back and goes through withdrawal in an attempt to stay sober, prioritising his relationship with Milla over his drug addiction.

After Milla's 17th birthday party, a happy occasion, she reveals to Moses that she is in constant pain and knows the end is near. She begs Moses to kill her by suffocation, but he cannot go through with it. Instead, the two have sex for the first time.

The following day Anna and Henry realise that Milla had sex the previous night and are happy for their daughter. When Anna goes to give Milla water in bed after Moses leaves the bedroom, she discovers that she had died during the night.

In a flashback, Henry remembers a day with Milla at the beach. She tells him she is at peace with dying and asks him to take care of Moses when she is gone. Henry, in turn, promises that he and Anna will be okay when she dies.

Cast
 Eliza Scanlen as Milla Finlay
 Toby Wallace as Moses
 Essie Davis as Anna Finlay
 Ben Mendelsohn as Henry Finlay
 Emily Barclay as Toby
 Eugene Gilfedder as Gidon
 Edward Lau as Tin Wah
 Zach Grech as Isaac
 Georgina Symes as Polly
 Michelle Lotters as Scarlett
 Andrea Demetriades as Jenny

Release
Babyteeth had its world premiere at the Venice International Film Festival on 4 September 2019, where it competed for the Golden Lion. It also screened at the BFI London Film Festival on 6 October 2019, where it competed in the First Feature Competition. Shortly after, IFC Films and Picturehouse Entertainment acquired US and UK distribution rights to the film, respectively.

The film was released in the United States on 19 June 2020, and in Australia on 23 July 2020 by Universal Pictures.

Reception
Babyteeth received positive reviews from film critics, when it screened at the Venice Film Festival. On Rotten Tomatoes it has an approval rating of 93 per cent based on reviews from 152 critics. The site's critics consensus reads: "Powerfully acted and sensitively directed, Babyteeth offers audiences a coming-of-age story that's messier – and more rewarding – than most." On Metacritic, the film has a weighted average score of 77 out of 100, based on 29 critics, indicating "generally favorable reviews".

David Ehrlich of IndieWire gave the film "B+", calling it "a movie that's off-kilter but always raw; delicate, but never precious". Varietys Guy Lodge describes it as an "arresting feature debut for both director Shannon Murphy and screenwriter Rita Kalnejais". Michael O'Sullivan of the Houston Chronicle praised Babyteeth, stating that it "works precisely because it refuses to accommodate expectation."

Kevin Maher of The Times gave the film five stars and described it as an "emotionally shattering feature debut from Shannon Murphy".

Accolades

References

External links
 

2019 films
2019 comedy-drama films
2010s coming-of-age comedy-drama films
2010s teen comedy-drama films
Australian coming-of-age comedy-drama films
Australian films based on plays
Australian teen comedy-drama films
Entertainment One films
Films about cancer
Films about drugs
Films about families
2010s English-language films